, also known as Revenge of a Kabuki Actor, is a 1963 Japanese film directed by Kon Ichikawa, based on a novel by Otokichi Mikami.

Plot
Japan in the late Edo period: Three men — Sansai Dobe, Kawaguchiya and Hiromiya — are responsible for the suicide of seven-year-old Yukitarō's mother and father. Yukitarō is adopted and brought up by Kikunojō Nakamura, the actor-manager of an Osaka kabuki troupe. The adult Yukitarō  becomes an onnagata, a male actor who plays female roles, taking the stage name Yukinojō. He wears women's clothes and uses the language and mannerisms of a woman offstage as well as on. 

Twenty years later, the troupe pays a visit to Edo, where the men responsible for his parents' deaths now live. Yukinojō brings about their deaths, then, having achieved his goal, and apparently overcome by the death of an innocent woman who was part of his schemes but whom he became fond of, retires from the stage and disappears.

The events are coolly observed and sardonically commented on by the Robin-Hood-like thief Yamitarō.

Cast
 Kazuo Hasegawa as Yukinojō Nakamura and Yamitarō
 Fujiko Yamamoto as Ohatsu
 Ayako Wakao as Namiji
 Raizō Ichikawa as Hirutarō
 Shintarō Katsu as Hōjin, the escaped convict
 Eiji Funakoshi as Heima Kadokura
 Chūsha Ichikawa as Kikunojō Nakamura
 Narutoshi Hayashi as Mukuzu
 Nakamura Ganjirō II as Sansai Dobe
 Saburō Date as Kawaguchiya
 Eijirō Yanagi as Hiromiya
 Jun Hamamura as Isshōsai
 Toshio Chiba as Rōnin
 Masayoshi Kikuno as Yukinojō’s father
 Kōichi Mizuhara as Dobe’s retainer
 Shirō Ōtsuji as First Constable
 Tokio Oki as Second Constable
 Michirō Minami as First Townsman
 Yutaka Nakamura as Second Townsman
 Chitose Maki as Townswoman
 Eigorō Onoe as The Shōgun
 Musei Tokugawa as Narrator

Production
Mikami's novel had been adapted for the screen numerous times before, the first time by Teinosuke Kinugasa (1935–36), which also starred Kazuo Hasegawa. The 1963 version was Hasegawa's 300th role as a film actor, who plays both Yukinojō and thief Yamitarō. The screenplay was written by director Ichikawa's wife, Natto Wada, based on Kinugasa's 1935 and Daisuke Itō's 1939 dramatisations. Yoshinobu Nishioka served as art director. The voice-over narration was provided by famous benshi Musei Tokugawa.

Title

The Japanese title is Yukinojō henge. Yukinojō is the stage-name of the central character, who is an onnagata or oyama. Among the senses of henge (whose basic meaning is change of form) are ghost, spectre and apparition. The title is sometimes rendered The Avenging Ghost of Yukinojō. Yukinojō uses his stage-craft to terrify one of his enemies by creating the illusion of a ghost, but there is no supernatural element in the film.

In the kabuki theatre the word henge has the technical sense of costume change. The type of play called a henge-mono (変化もの) is a quick-change piece in which the leading actor plays a number of roles and undergoes many on-stage changes of costume. The title thus has as one of its senses The Many Guises of Yukinojō. The usual English title is from a line of dialogue when the character Yamitarō, having learned that Yukinojō proposes to take revenge on his enemies by elaborate plots rather than killing them at the first opportunity, says to himself "As you might expect of an actor’s revenge, it’s going to be a flamboyant performance" (Yakusha no katakiuchi dakeatte, kotta mon da: 役者の敵討ちだけあって、こったもんだ).

References

External links 
 
 
 DVD Times review
 An Actor’s Revenge and a Director’s Triumph an essay by Michael Sragow at the Criterion Collection

1963 films
1963 drama films
Japanese drama films
1960s Japanese-language films
Films about actors
Japanese films about revenge
Kabuki
Daiei Film films
Films directed by Kon Ichikawa
Films with screenplays by Natto Wada
Films produced by Masaichi Nagata
1960s Japanese films